US Army Garrison Okinawa is a United States Army facility located in Yomitan, Okinawa Prefecture, Japan. Home to the United States Army on Okinawa, 10th Support Group (Regional), along with the 1st Battalion, 1st Special Forces Group (Airborne), 247th MP DET, and the 349th Signal Company (78th SIG BN) provide support to all other U.S. military services on the island.  Formerly named 'Torii Station', the garrison was re-designated in March 2014.

Description 
The unit is the main United States Army garrison in the Okinawa prefecture. US Army Garrison Okinawa is responsible for receiving and distributing cargo, distributing the island's military fuel supply, and port operations.
The site is located in the level area of southwestern Yomitan village and is a very significant strategic communication network. Over 400 Japanese farmers maintain fields on the base for farming crops such as sugar cane, but the space allocations for farming are shrinking.

References

External links 
 Army on Okinawa and 10th Regional Support Group
 Torii, USARJ Newspaper
 Fact Database
 Military Networking Site
 Phone Directory
 Torii MWR Site
 Torii Station on themilitaryzone

United States Armed Forces in Okinawa Prefecture
Installations of the United States Army in Japan